John VIII Xiphilinos (c. 1010 – 2 August 1075), a native of Trebizond, was a Byzantine intellectual, jurist, and patriarch of Constantinople from 1064 to 1075. He was the uncle of John Xiphilinus, the Epimator. He is considered "an innovator in the field of the methodology of jurisprudential research."

Early career
John Xiphilinos was born in Trebizond. He pursued studies at the University of Constantinople and eventually became nomophylax of its School of Law. Later he became a monk and was eventually selected by Emperor Constantine X Doukas (1059–67) to succeed Constantine Leichoudes as the patriarch of Constantinople.

Episcopacy
In 1072, John VIII presided over an assembly of metropolitans and archbishops at the oratory of Saint Alexius in which the question of the election of bishops to vacant sees was discussed. Michael Keroularios had forbidden metropolitans who were resident in Constantinople from participating in such elections. John, however, recognized that metropolitans sometimes had to remain for a long period in the capital due to ecclesiastical business or illness. The assembly with John's consent decreed that metropolitans who gave the patriarch advance notification of their intent could again vote while resident in Constantinople. After his death, his remains were buried at the monastery of Angourion on 2 August 1075.

John VIII wrote a hagiography of Saint Eugenios of Trebizond.

John VIII has been canonized in the Eastern Orthodox Church and his feast day is celebrated on August 30.

References

External links
 John VIII Xiphilinos – Encyclopedia of the Hellenic World 

1010 births
1075 deaths

11th-century patriarchs of Constantinople
Byzantine Pontians
People from Trapezus
Byzantine jurists
11th-century jurists

Year of birth uncertain